At the 1956 Summer Olympics in Melbourne, seven events in shooting were contested, all for men only. They were held between 29 November and 5 December 1956.

Medal summary

Participating nations
A total of 156 shooters from 37 nations competed at the Melbourne Games:

Medal table

References

External links
 

 
1956 Summer Olympics events
1956
Olympics
Shooting sports in Australia
Shooting competitions in Australia